Uniform field theory is a formula for determining the effective electrical resistance of a parallel wire system. By calculating the mean square field acting throughout a section of coil, formulae are obtained for the effective resistances of single- and multi-layer solenoidal coils of either solid or stranded wire.

See also
Mathematical methods in electronics

References

Applied mathematics
Electronic engineering